The 1915 VPI Gobblers football team represented Virginia Agricultural and Mechanical College and Polytechnic Institute in the 1915 college football season. The team was led by their head coach Branch Bocock and finished with a record of four wins and four losses (4–4).

Schedule

Game summaries

Roanoke

The starting lineup for VPI was: Cottrell (left end), Parrish (left tackle), A. B. Moore (left guard), Henderson (center), Treakle (right guard), Caffee (right tackle), A. P. Moore (right end), Terry (quarterback), Dixon (left halfback), Denny (right halfback), Redd (fullback).The substitutes were: Benedict, Bopp, Clemmer, F. A. Engleby, J. T. Engleby, Funkhouser, Graves, Gregory, Hall, Howell, Huddle and Logan.

Randolph–Macon

The starting lineup for VPI was: Gregory (left end), Parrish (left tackle), A. B. Moore (left guard), Henderson (center), Benedict (right guard), Hall (right tackle), Huddle (right end), Terry (quarterback), Funkhouser (left halfback), Denny (right halfback), Treakle (fullback).The substitutes were: Dixon, J. T. Engleby, Graves, A. P. Moore, Powell and Redd.

Hampden–Sydney

The starting lineup for VPI was: Huddle (left end), Parrish (left tackle), A. B. Moore (left guard), Henderson (center), Bopp (right guard), Caffee (right tackle), A. P. Moore (right end), Funkhouser (quarterback), Denny (left halfback), Powell (right halfback), Treakle (fullback).The substitutes were: Clemmer, Cottrell, Dixon, Engleby, Gregory, Hall, Harvey, Logan, Redd and Terry.

Washington and Lee

The starting lineup for VPI was: Cottrell (left end), Bopp (left tackle), A. B. Moore (left guard), Henderson (center), Benedict (right guard), Caffee (right tackle), A. P. Moore (right end), Dixon (quarterback), Funkhouser (left halfback), Powell (right halfback), Redd (fullback).The substitutes were: Denny, Gregory, Hall, Huddle, Parrish and Treakle.

Navy

The starting lineup for VPI was: Gregory (left end), Benedict (left tackle), A. B. Moore (left guard), Henderson (center), Parrish (right guard), Caffee (right tackle), Hall (right end), Dixon (quarterback), Funkhouser (left halfback), Powell (right halfback), Redd (fullback).The substitutes were: Denny and Huddle.

Cornell

The starting lineup for VPI was: Cottrell (left end), Benedict (left tackle), Bopp (left guard), A. B. Moore (center), Treakle (right guard), Parrish (right tackle), Hall (right end), Terry (quarterback), Engleby (left halfback), Powell (right halfback), Redd (fullback).The substitutes were: Dixon, Gray, Gregory, Henderson, Lybrook and A. P. Moore.

Cancelled Game with King College
VPI was scheduled to play King College on November 6 in Blacksburg, Virginia.

West Virginia

The starting lineup for VPI was: Huddle (left end), Benedict (left tackle),  A. P. Moore (left guard), A. B. Moore (center), Bopp (right guard), Parrish (right tackle), Hall (right end), Terry (quarterback), Dixon (left halfback), Powell (right halfback), Redd (fullback).The substitutes were: Cottrell, Engleby and Henderson.

VMI

The starting lineup for VPI was: Gregory (left end), Benedict (left tackle), A. P. Moore (left guard), A. B. Moore (center), Bopp (right guard), Parrish (right tackle), Gaines (right end), Funkhouser (quarterback), Huddle (left halfback), Powell (right halfback), Redd (fullback).The substitutes were: Caffee, Dixon, Engleby, Hall and Henderson.

Players
The following players were members of the 1915 football team according to the roster published in the 1916 edition of The Bugle, the Virginia Tech yearbook.

References

VPI
Virginia Tech Hokies football seasons
VPI Gobblers football